The China Travel Service (Abbreviation: CTS) is the tourism and travel agency of the government of the People's Republic of China. It was established on 19 November 1949 with the goal of marketing China to the rest of the world and promoting tourism. It is a subordinate agency to the National Tourism Administration.

See also

 Tourism in China

References

External links
 Official Site

Government agencies of China
Travel and holiday companies of China